Joan Darome (born October 15, 1989) is an Indonesian footballer who currently plays for Persiram Raja Ampat in the Indonesia Super League.

Club statistics

References

External links

1989 births
Association football defenders
Living people
Indonesian footballers
Papuan sportspeople
Liga 1 (Indonesia) players
Persiram Raja Ampat players